Milan Mirić may refer to:
 Milan Mirić (writer)
 Milan Mirić (footballer)